Momma is an American indie rock band from Los Angeles, California.

History
Momma consists of Etta Friedman and Allegra Weingarten, who have been friends with each other since meeting at Viewpoint School, as well as drummer Zach Capitti Fenton. Momma released their first album in 2018 through Danger Collective Records, titled Interloper. On February 24, 2020, Momma announced their second album, Two Of Me, alongside a new song, "Double Dare". On April 6, 2020, Momma shared another song from the album, "Biohazard". The album was recorded during summer break while the members were attending college. The album was described as a concept album. The band went on to release their third album, Household Name, on July 1, 2022 via Polyvinyl and Lucky Number to critical acclaim.

Discography

Singles
Apollo/Highway (2019)
Medicine (2021)
Rockstar (2022)
Lucky (2022)
Motorbike (2022)
Speeding 72 (2022)
Bang Bang (2023)

EPs
thanks come again (2016)
Momma on Audiotree Live (2022)

Studio albums
Interloper (2018)
Two of Me (2020)
Household Name (2022)

References

Indie rock musical groups from California
Musical groups from Los Angeles
Year of establishment missing